Viscount Ashbrook is a title in the Peerage of Ireland. It was created in 1751 for Captain Henry Flower, 2nd Baron Castle Durrow. The title of Baron Castle Durrow, in the County of Kilkenny, had been created in the Peerage of Ireland in 1733 for his father William Flower. He was a Colonel in the Army and also represented County Kilkenny and Portarlington in the Irish House of Commons. He was praised by Jonathan Swift as "a gentleman of very great sense and wit". , the titles are held by the first Viscount's descendant, the eleventh Viscount, who succeeded his father in 1995.

The family seat is Arley Hall, near Arley, Cheshire. The family also previously owned Castle Durrow, near Durrow, County Laois, Beaumont Lodge, near Old Windsor, Berkshire, and an estate at Abercynrig, Brecon, Powys, which passed to them by inheritance from the Jeffreys family of Brecon.

Barons Castle Durrow (1733)
William Flower, 1st Baron Castle Durrow (1685–1746)
Henry Flower, 2nd Baron Castle Durrow (died 1752) (created Viscount Ashbrook in 1751)

Viscounts Ashbrook (1751)
Henry Flower, 1st Viscount Ashbrook (died 1752)
William Flower, 2nd Viscount Ashbrook (1744–1780)
William Flower, 3rd Viscount Ashbrook (1767–1802) buried at Shellingford
Henry Jeffrey Flower, 4th Viscount Ashbrook (1776–1847)
Henry Jeffrey Flower, 5th Viscount Ashbrook (1806–1871)
Henry Jeffrey Flower, 6th Viscount Ashbrook (1829–1882)
William Spencer Flower, 7th Viscount Ashbrook (1830–1906)
Robert Thomas Flower, 8th Viscount Ashbrook (1836–1919)
Llowarch Robert Flower, 9th Viscount Ashbrook (1870–1936)
Desmond Llowarch Edward Flower, 10th Viscount Ashbrook (1905–1995)
Michael Llowarch Warburton Flower, 11th Viscount Ashbrook (b. 1935)

The heir apparent is the present holder's son Hon. Rowland Francis Warburton Flower (b. 1975)
The heir apparent's heir apparent is his son Benjamin Warburton Flower (b. 2006)

Ancestry

Notes

References
Kidd, Charles, Williamson, David (editors). Debrett's Peerage and Baronetage (1990 edition). New York: St Martin's Press, 1990,

Bibliography
Godson, Julie Ann, "The Water Gypsy. How a Thames fishergirl became a viscountess" (FeedARead.com, 2014). A biography of Betty Ridge (1745–1808) who married William Flower, 2nd Viscount Ashbrook (1744–1780), and history of the Ridge and Flower families

External links
Arley Hall
History of Castle Durrow

Viscountcies in the Peerage of Ireland
Noble titles created in 1751